The following highways are numbered 904:

Costa Rica
 National Route 904

United States